Zsolt Vári (born January 14, 1969 in Budapest) is a Hungarian sport shooter. He competed in rifle shooting events at the Summer Olympics in 1992 and 1996.

Olympic results

References

1969 births
Living people
ISSF rifle shooters
Hungarian male sport shooters
Shooters at the 1992 Summer Olympics
Shooters at the 1996 Summer Olympics
Olympic shooters of Hungary
Sport shooters from Budapest